The 1947–48 Northeastern Huskies men's ice hockey season was the 16th season of play for the program but first under the oversight of the NCAA. The Huskies represented Northeastern University and were coached by Herb Gallagher, in his 8th season.

Season

Roster

Standings

Schedule and results

|-
!colspan=12 style=";" | Regular Season

|-
!colspan=12 style=";" | NEIHL Tournament

References

Northeastern Huskies men's ice hockey seasons
Northeastern
Northeastern
Northeastern
Northeastern